The Maret Building is located at 128 Muhammad V Boulevard in downtown Casablanca, Morocco. It was designed by Hippolyte Joseph Delaporte and it was built in 1932, during the French protectorate. Its architecture is a prominent example of the fusion of Neo-Mauresque and Neoclassical architecture with Art Deco touches. The Maret Building features a colorful ziliij-covered dome.

Architecture 
The Maret Building has 7 floors including a ground floor. Its architectural style is a fusion of Neo Mauresque (Moorish Revival), Neoclassical, and Modern architecture. A series of horizontal wavelike concrete curves spread out across the main facade from the rounded corner of the building. On the 6th floor, there is an arcade that gives contrastive emphasis to the floor below, which is covered with ziliij tiles. The tiles are multicolored, but the predominant color is turquoise; it is reminiscent of Antoni Gaudí's work. The corner of the building is crowned with a ziliij-covered dome.

References 

Buildings and structures in Casablanca